Jana Gantnerová-Šoltýsová (born 30 September 1959 in Kežmarok) is a Slovak former alpine skier who competed for Czechoslovakia in the 1976 Winter Olympics, 1980 Winter Olympics, and 1984 Winter Olympics. In December 1980, she won an Alpine Skiing World Cup downhill in Altenmarkt, becoming the first east European skier to win a World Cup race. Her best performance at the Olympics was a fifth place in the downhill in 1984. Since retiring from competition, she has served as president of the Slovak Skiing Association, as a member of the Slovak Olympic Committee Executive Board, as a member of the International Ski Federation Alpine Commission, and as Deputy Chef de Mission for the Slovak team at the 2010 Winter Olympics. She is the mother of alpine skier Jana Gantnerová.

World Cup results

Race victories
1 win – (1 DH, 0 SG, 0 GS, 0 SL, 0 K)

References

External links
 

1959 births
Living people
Slovak female alpine skiers
Olympic alpine skiers of Czechoslovakia
Czechoslovak female alpine skiers
Alpine skiers at the 1976 Winter Olympics
Alpine skiers at the 1980 Winter Olympics
Alpine skiers at the 1984 Winter Olympics
Universiade medalists in alpine skiing
People from Kežmarok
Sportspeople from the Prešov Region
Universiade gold medalists for Czechoslovakia
Universiade silver medalists for Czechoslovakia
Competitors at the 1983 Winter Universiade
Competitors at the 1985 Winter Universiade